Yeast: A Problem (1848) was the first novel by the Victorian social and religious controversialist Charles Kingsley.

Themes and sources 

Motivated by his strong convictions as a Christian Socialist Kingsley wrote Yeast as an attack on Roman Catholicism and the Oxford Movement, on celibacy, the game laws, bad landlords and bad sanitation, and on the whole social system insofar as it kept England’s agricultural labourer class in poverty.  The title was intended to suggest the "ferment of new ideas".Yeast was influenced by the works of the philosopher Thomas Carlyle, and by Henry Brooke's novel The Fool of Quality.

Publication 

Yeast was first published in instalments in Fraser's Magazine, starting in July 1848, but as the radicalism of Kingsley's ideas became apparent the magazine's publisher took fright and induced the author to bring his novel to a premature close.  In 1851 it appeared in volume form.

Criticism 

It is sometimes said that Yeast suffers from its over-reliance on long conversations between its hero, Lancelot Smith, and the subsidiary characters of the novel, and from Kingsley's failure to integrate these discussions into anything resembling a coherent plot.  On the other hand many have admired the vividness of Kingsley's depiction of the degradation and grinding poverty of the lower classes in the English shires.

Footnotes

References

External links 
 Full text at the Internet Archive

1848 British novels
1851 British novels
Novels by Charles Kingsley
English novels
Novels first published in serial form
Works originally published in Fraser's Magazine
1851 debut novels
Anti-Catholic publications